Live Tour was the name given to French pop singer Lorie's first concert tour. On 25 August 2003 a live recording of the show was released in two versions: a regular, jewel case release containing the CD and a DVD, and a limited edition cardboard box also including an exclusive all-access pass from the concert, five photos from the show in 20x29 cm format and a message written by the popular female singer. The CD booklet in both versions is a fold out poster. On 20 October 2003 a filmed version of the show was released on DVD.

Live album track listing

CD

 "Intro Show Lorie" — 2'21
 "Près de moi" — 4'17
 "Toute seule" — 3'35
 "Pour que tu me reviennes" — 4'08
 "I Love You" — 5'00
 "Ne me dis rien" — 4'17
 "Entre vous deux" — 3'48
 "L'homme de ma vie" — 3'57
 "Dans mes rêves" — 4'33
 "Je t'aime Maman" — 4'03
 "Laisse faire le fun" (duo 4 You) — 4'21
 "Fan'2 toi" — 4'30
 "Je serai (ta meilleure amie)" — 5'20
 "Tendrement" — 4'34
 "Tout pour toi" — 4'13
 "Ton sourire" — 4'08
 "À 20 ans" — 3'23
 "J'ai besoin d'amour" — 4'28
 "Se donner la main" — 4'27

DVD

 "Sur un air latino" (Making of) — 27'00
 "Sur un air latino" (Karaoke) — 3'31
 "Sur un air latino" (Music video) — 3'31
 "À 20 ans" (Making of) — 10'00
 "Exclusive excerpts from the tour" — 5'00

Charts

Certifications

References

Lorie (singer) live albums
Live video albums
2003 live albums
2003 video albums
Sony Music France live albums
Sony Music France video albums